This article lists the presidents of the National Assembly Chad, from the establishment of the National Assembly of Chad in 1959 to the present day.

List of officeholders

Presidents of the National Assembly of Chad (1959–1990)

Presidents of Conseil Supérieur de Transition (CST, 1993–1997)

Presidents of the National Assembly of Chad (1997-2021)

Presidents of Transitional National Council

Sources

Politics of Chad
Chad, National Assembly
 
1960 establishments in Chad